Smart terminal may refer to:

Block-oriented terminal, which typically offloads form or panel editing from a mainframe computer
A computer terminal with capabilities for cursor positioning, or other display formatting capabilities beyond a text-mode teleprinter
A credit card terminal which supports various payment methods
Thin client computer, with local data processing capacity